Jörg Ritzerfeld (born 28 June 1983) is a German former ski jumper who competed from 2001 to 2011. His best finishes at World Cup level were third in Pragelato on 12 February 2005 and in Willingen on 11 February 2007, both in team events.

References 

1983 births
German male ski jumpers
Living people
People from Suhl
Sportspeople from Thuringia